A simple precedence grammar is a context-free formal grammar that can be parsed with a simple precedence parser.

Formal definition

G = (N, Σ, P, S) is a simple precedence grammar if all the production rules in P comply with the following constraints:

 There are no erasing rules (ε-productions)
 There are no useless rules (unreachable symbols or unproductive rules)
 For each pair of symbols X, Y (X, Y  (N ∪ Σ)) there is only one Wirth–Weber precedence relation.
 G is uniquely inversible

Examples
 

precedence table

Notes

References
 Alfred V. Aho, Jeffrey D. Ullman (1977). Principles of Compiler Design. 1st Edition. Addison–Wesley.
 William A. Barrett, John D. Couch (1979). Compiler construction: Theory and Practice. Science Research Associate.
 Jean-Paul Tremblay, P. G. Sorenson (1985). The Theory and Practice of Compiler Writing. McGraw–Hill.

External links
 "Simple Precedence Relations" at Clemson University

Formal languages